Igor Dević (born 9 March 1984 in Zagreb) is a Croatian football player.

Club career
After playing in Zagreb's club NK Rudeš he moved to Slovenia where he played one season with the historical NK Olimpija Ljubljana. He ten returned to Rudeš and played with them in the 2004–05 Croatian Cup.  In 2004, he moved to Serbia where he will play several seasons with OFK Beograd, and one, 2008-09 with FK Napredak Kruševac.

References

1984 births
Living people
Footballers from Zagreb
Association football midfielders
Croatian footballers
NK Rudeš players
NK Olimpija Ljubljana (1945–2005) players
OFK Beograd players
FK Napredak Kruševac players
Serbian SuperLiga players
Croatian expatriate footballers
Expatriate footballers in Slovenia
Croatian expatriate sportspeople in Slovenia
Expatriate footballers in Serbia
Croatian expatriate sportspeople in Serbia